Han Dejun is a Chinese basketball player who currently plays for Liaoning Flying Leopards in the Chinese Basketball Association.

CBA career
He would see a steady increase of playing time throughout the next couple of seasons an averaged 13.1 points per game and 7.7 rebounds per game in the 2011-12 season. Prior to the beginning of the 2012-13 season, there was speculation that Han was set to leave Liaoning to join the Beijing Ducks. Both Liaoning and Beijing denied these claims and in the end, Han signed a two-year contract extension with his team. On 2 December 2012, Han scored 15 points in a win over the Tianjin Golden Lions. He then proceeded to score 23 points while grabbing 9 rebounds in a road loss to the Shandong Lions.

International career
In May 2010, Han was selected to participate as a preliminary squad member for the Chinese national basketball team. Han, along with four of his club teammates, was selected to participate as a preliminary squad member again in 2012.

Han was included in China's squad for the 2023 FIBA Basketball World Cup qualification.

Career statistics

CBA statistics

References

External links
Profile at Eurobasket.com

1987 births
Living people
Centers (basketball)
Basketball players from Liaoning
Chinese men's basketball players
Liaoning Flying Leopards players
People from Panjin